Carrafa is a surname. Notable people with the surname include:

Juan Carrafa (1755–1825?), Italian military officer in the Spanish army
Nick Carrafa (fl. 1984–), Australian actor
John Carrafa (fl. 1987–), American theater and film director and choreographer